The Old Hamilton County Jail is a historic building at 501 Northeast 1st Avenue, Jasper, Florida, United States. It was added to the National Register of Historic Places in 1983.  The Old Hamilton County Jail now serves as the Hamilton County Historical Museum.

Hamilton County Historical Museum

The Hamilton County Historical Museum consists of a jail.

See also
Jails and prisons listed on the National Register of Historic Places

References

External links
 Hamilton County Historical Museum - official site
 Hamilton County listings, Florida's Office of Cultural and Historical Programs

Hamilton County Jail
Museums in Hamilton County, Florida
Hamilton County Jail
Prison museums in Florida
History museums in Florida
Jails in Florida
National Register of Historic Places in Hamilton County, Florida
1893 establishments in Florida